Lucy Jane Quinn (born 29 September 1993) is a professional footballer who plays as a forward for Women's Championship club Birmingham City. Born in England, she is a member of the Republic of Ireland women's national team. She joined Birmingham City for a second time in 2021, having also played for Portsmouth, Yeovil Town and Tottenham Hotspur.

Career

Yeovil Town
Growing up, Quinn studied GCSEs at Wildern Secondary School and later studied A levels at Itchen College in Southampton. Quinn signed with FA WSL 2 side Yeovil Town during the summer of 2016. She scored her first goal for the club during her debut – a 1–1 draw against Sheffield.

Birmingham City
In September 2017, it was announced Quinn had signed with Birmingham City. During a match against former league champions Manchester City, she scored the game-opening goal to lift Birmingham to a 1–0 lead within the first ten minutes.

International career
Quinn represented Great Britain at the 2017 World University Games where she won the golden boot award for most goals scored. The same year, she represented England at the 2017 Women's Euro Beach Soccer Cup, where she earned the best goalkeeper award.

In September 2021, Quinn received her Irish passport and FIFA approval to play for the Republic of Ireland women's national football team. Her first call-up was for a friendly game against Australia on 21 September 2021 at Tallaght Stadium. Quinn started Ireland's 3–2 win and was credited with creating an own goal in the 11th minute when her free kick deflected into the goal off Australia goalkeeper Mackenzie Arnold to give Ireland the lead: "I can absolutely claim the goal no matter what it goes down as. I had to do something to make the keeper have to work. So for me it's a debut goal, no one can take it away from me."

Honours
 England beach soccer
 Euro Beach Soccer Cup winner: 2017

Individual
 2017 World University Games golden boot
 2017 Women's Euro Beach Soccer Cup best goalkeeper

References

External links
 Birmingham player profile 
 

Living people
English women's footballers
Women's association football forwards
Women's Super League players
Birmingham City W.F.C. players
1993 births
Yeovil Town L.F.C. players
Portsmouth F.C. Women players
Footballers from Hampshire
Tottenham Hotspur F.C. Women players
English people of Irish descent
Republic of Ireland women's association footballers
Republic of Ireland women's international footballers